Sheetla Prasad is an Indian politician and a member of 17th Legislative Assembly of Sirathu, Uttar Pradesh of India. He represents the Sirathu constituency of Uttar Pradesh. He is a member of the Bharatiya Janata Party.

Political career
Prasad has been a member of the 17th Legislative Assembly of Uttar Pradesh. Since 2017, he has represented the Sirathu constituency and is a member of the BJP.

Posts held

See also
Uttar Pradesh Legislative Assembly

References

Uttar Pradesh MLAs 2017–2022
Bharatiya Janata Party politicians from Uttar Pradesh
Living people
Year of birth missing (living people)